Ivan Lapčević (born 26 March 1976) is a Serbian handball coach and former player.

Club career
After starting out at his hometown club Župa Aleksandrovac, Lapčević went on to play for Železničar Niš (1996–2001), Barcelona (2001–2002), VfL Gummersbach (2002–2005), MKB Veszprém (2005–2010), Napredak Kruševac (2010), Puerto Sagunto (2010–2011) and Romagna (2011–2012).

International career
At international level, Lapčević represented Serbia and Montenegro (known as FR Yugoslavia until 2003) in six major tournaments, winning two bronze medals at the World Championships (1999 and 2001). He also participated in the 2000 Summer Olympics.

Coaching career
In February 2019, Lapčević took charge at Serbian Handball Super B League team Požarevac.

Honours
Železničar Niš
 Handball Cup of FR Yugoslavia: 1996–97, 1998–99
Barcelona
 Copa ASOBAL: 2001–02
MKB Veszprém
 Nemzeti Bajnokság I: 2005–06, 2007–08, 2008–09, 2009–10
 Magyar Kupa: 2006–07, 2008–09, 2009–10
 EHF Cup Winners' Cup: 2007–08

References

External links
 EHF record
 MKSZ record
 Olympic record

1976 births
Living people
People from Aleksandrovac
Serbian male handball players
Olympic handball players of Yugoslavia
Handball players at the 2000 Summer Olympics
FC Barcelona Handbol players
VfL Gummersbach players
Veszprém KC players
Liga ASOBAL players
Handball-Bundesliga players
Expatriate handball players
Serbia and Montenegro expatriate sportspeople in Spain
Serbia and Montenegro expatriate sportspeople in Germany
Serbia and Montenegro expatriate sportspeople in Hungary
Serbian expatriate sportspeople in Hungary
Serbian expatriate sportspeople in Spain
Serbian expatriate sportspeople in Italy
Serbian handball coaches